Hastings is a neighbourhood of Central Kolkata in Kolkata district in the Indian state of West Bengal.

History

Hastings is an area in Central Kolkata between the Maidan and the Hooghly River. The area named after Warren Hastings, who was the first Governor-General of Bengal then the whole of India from 1772 to 1785.

The Hastings area was initially a Muslim burial ground, then became ‘Coolie Bazar’ for workmen who built Fort William and finally turned into a township for the Ordnance and Commissariat department people.

This was originally the military area of the city and several landmarks remain including Fort William, the Lascar War Memorial and the Ordnance Club, as well as the Race Course. In 1855, a Church Hastings Chapel, Kolkata was built there for the officers of the East India Company.

In 1888, one of the 25 newly organized police section houses was located in Hastings.

This is also where one of the city’s major thoroughfares feeds onto Vidyasagar Setu, the impressive suspension bridge crossing the Hooghly River which was completed in 1992.

Geography

Police district
Hastings police station is part of the South division of Kolkata Police. It is located at 5, Middle Road, Kolkata-700022.

Tollygunge Womens police station has jurisdiction over all the police districts in the South Division, i.e. Park Street, Shakespeare Sarani, Alipore, Hastings, Maidan, Bhowanipore, Kalighat, Tollygunge, Charu Market, New Alipur and Chetla.

Transport

Road

Train
Prinsep Ghat railway station and Eden Gardens railway station on Kolkata Circular Railway line are the nearest railway stations.

References

External links
 

Neighbourhoods in Kolkata